The Australia national baseball team was the third nation, after the United States and Sweden, to participate in baseball at the Summer Olympics, making their first appearance at the 1956 Games in Melbourne, and again as part of its demonstration at the 1988 Games in Seoul.

Since baseball was first included as a medal sport at the 1992 Games in Barcelona, Australia has participated in three of the five tournaments. The best result achieved was in the 2004 Games in Athens, where Australia lost the gold medal match to Cuba to receive silver. Their medal tally puts them at 5th, equal to Chinese Taipei.

Australia is the only country to have hosted an Olympic baseball tournament as a medal sport, won an Olympic medal, and done so in separate years: hosted in 2000, won silver in 2004. Australia is also one of only two countries—the other being the United States—to have hosted baseball events as both a non-medal and medal sport.

Melbourne, 1956 

In 1956, two demonstration sports were allowed: a sport from the host nation and a foreign sport—Australian rules football and baseball respectively. Rather than the tournaments that would be played at future Games while still a demonstration sport, a single match was played against a team representing the United States selected from the U.S. Far East Command, on 1 December 1956, at the Melbourne Cricket Ground.

Though many of the 114,000 people who attended were believed to be attending in anticipation of the athletics events to be held that afternoon, until an exhibition game played at the Los Angeles Memorial Coliseum in 2008 between the Los Angeles Dodgers and the Boston Red Sox, it had the largest attendance for a baseball game ever. Even with this distinctive home-ground advantage, the Australians were unable to win, losing 11–5 in six innings.

Seoul, 1988 

1988 was the last time that baseball was included as an Olympic sport without medal status, and was the second time that Australia participated at the Olympic level. Though not originally included in the eight team tournament, Australia joined Canada, Chinese Taipei, Japan, the Netherlands, Puerto Rico, South Korea and the United States after Cuba chose to boycott the Games. Australia was pooled with Canada, South Korea and the United States, but failed to qualify for the finals.

Atlanta, 1996 

Prior to the Games proper, Australia had to qualify to compete in the baseball tournament. After the host nation automatically qualifying, two spots were available each to European, American and Asian teams, while the final spot was available to the winner of a playoff between the Oceania Champions and the African Champions. Australia won this contest, depriving South Africa of its first opportunity to compete in Olympic baseball.

Australia became the tenth nation to compete for an Olympic medal in baseball, when they played Cuba in the opening game of their 1996 campaign. This game set the record for the most runs scored in an Olympic baseball match—a record that stood through to the final Olympic tournament in 2008 Beijing Games in Beijing—with the two teams combining to score 27 runs, Cuba winning 19–8. The previous record was set at the 1992 Barcelona Games, when Chinese Taipei defeated hosts Spain 20–0.

After losing their first two mercy rule shortened games to Cuba and the Netherlands, Australia recorded their first victory against defending bronze-medalists Japan. Australia won only one of their remaining four games (against South Korea), which included two more mercy-rule losses to the United States and Nicaragua. They finished the preliminary stage seventh, ahead of South Korea.

Though it has been equaled since, the loss to Cuba in the first game remains the largest defeat Australia has suffered in Olympic baseball.

Sydney, 2000 

Having hosted and won gold in the 1999 Intercontinental Cup ten months prior, with only one loss in the whole competition—including two victories over powerhouse Cuba—there were great expectations for Australia to perform in front of home crowds again in the 2000 Sydney Olympics. Despite virtually the same line-up of teams (South Africa qualified for the Games while Chinese Taipei did not) Australia could only manage two victories during the round-robin phase against South Korea and South Africa.

The loss to the United States in Australia's final game of the tournament equalled the largest loss they'd suffered in Olympic competition four years previously at the hands of Cuba.

Athens, 2004

Qualifying 
As had been the case in the previous Olympics, Oceania and Africa teams first had to become champions of their respective continents before facing in a deciding series to determine the last of eight spots available. For the third successive Olympic Games, South Africa represented Africa, having won the gold medal at the 2003 All-Africa Games. Australia was scheduled to compete against Guam in the 2004 Oceania Baseball Championship, with the winner advancing to the playoff against South Africa. Three days before the best-of-five game series was due to start, Guam withdrew from the tournament, resulting in Australia's win by default.

Australia hosted the best-of-five-game series against South Africa at Blacktown Olympic Park, one of two venues for the 2000 Games. Australia swept the series 3–0 to advance to the main Olympic tournament in Athens. Australian short stop Glenn Williams was named the series Most Valuable Player.

The Games

Preliminary phase 
Despite losing the first two games against Cuba and South Korea, Australia won their next four games to secure a position in the semi finals, including a record setting 22–2 demolition of Netherlands. No other team before or since has scored more than 20 runs in an Olympic baseball game, and only one other time has a team won by a margin of 20. (Chinese Taipei in 1992 beat Spain 20–0, and Cuba in 1996 beat Italy 20–6.) Olympic baseball operated with a mercy rule that would stop a game after seven (or eight) innings if one team was leading by ten or more runs, making it more difficult to post such large victories. Canada defeated Australia in their final round-robin game 11–0, making it the third time Australia had been beaten by a margin of 11 runs in as many tournaments.

Final phase 
In the semis, Australia faced Japan. In pool play Australia had won relatively comfortably 9–4, though it took a much more hard-fought effort to clinch their first medal: they won 1–0. This set up a rematch of the very first match of the tournament to decide the gold medal, between Australia and Cuba. As in their previous three encounters, Cuba won to take gold, leaving Australia to claim silver in their best Olympic result, and their best result to date in a major international tournament. (The IBAF includes the Baseball World Cup, World Baseball Classic and Olympic Games as major world championships, while the Intercontinental Cup is considered a minor world championship.)

Beijing, 2008 

The 2008 Olympic Games baseball tournament saw the introduction of an expanded qualification phase. At prior Games, the host nation automatically qualified along with the top two teams from the Americas, Europe and Asia, and the eighth team being determined by a playoff between the best team from Oceania and from Africa. In an attempt to make the qualification a fairer representation of the top baseball nations, this was adjusted to include:
 the host nation
 the top 2 teams from an Americas qualifying tournament
 the top team from the 2007 European Baseball Championship
 the top team from the 2007 Asian Baseball Championship
 the top 3 teams from the Final Olympic Qualifying Tournament, consisting of:
 the 3rd & 4th placed American teams
 the 2nd & 3rd placed European teams (in actuality, the 2nd placed Great Britain withdrew, and were replaced by 4th placed Germany)
 the 2nd & 3rd placed Asian teams
 the top team from an Oceania qualifying tournament
 the top team from an African qualifying tournament

Despite the change to the qualification structure, there were concerns raised by Australia and Canada about the timing of the tournament. As the tournament was scheduled for March, many of the players who would have otherwise been selected for the Australian, Canadian, and Mexican teams were unavailable due to commitments in the American Major League system. Though the Minor League players were eligible to play both in the qualifying tournament and the main Olympic competition, many were unavailable either due to the Major League clubs denying individuals permission, or players on the cusp of promotion to Major League teams choosing to remain in spring training camp.

When New Zealand withdrew from the 2007 Oceania Baseball Championship—intended to be a five-game series between the two nations—Australia was automatically awarded the Oceania berth in the Final Olympic Qualifying Tournament.

Warm-up 
A series of exhibition games were scheduled, both to give match practice to the players, and also to serve as selection trials for the tournament itself. Two games were played against the New South Wales Patriots—a state side—in Sydney. As some of the players in the Australian team would likely come from the Patriots, New South Wales selected its team first for the two games. Given the lack of match practice at the international level, an additional series was organised, with Australia hosting Canada in what was originally going to be a four-game series. However five games were held, two in Brisbane and three on the Gold Coast. The Patriots won their series 1–0, and Canada won theirs 3–1, with one game drawn after 9 innings in each series.

Qualifying 
Four days after the exhibition series on home soil, Australia competed in a round-robin format against Canada, Chinese Taipei, Germany, Mexico, South Africa, South Korea and Spain. Australia failed to qualify for the Olympic Games, finishing the tournament in 5th position. Their largest defeat in the tournament proved to be the decisive game for them, despite being only their second: had Australia beaten South Korea, rather than losing to them 16–2 in a mercy rule shortened game, Australia would have finished the tournament in 3rd, South Korea in 4th and Mexico 5th. This is particularly interesting, given that South Korea went on to win gold at Beijing.

Overall record

See also 
 Australian Baseball Federation
 Australia national baseball team
 Baseball at the Summer Olympics

Footnotes

References

Bibliography

External links 
 Australian Baseball Federation
 International Olympic Committee

Olympics
baseball team